Rachel Roberts is an American mathematician specializing in low-dimensional topology, including foliations and contact geometry. She is the Elinor Anheuser Professor of Mathematics at Washington University in St. Louis.

Roberts completed her Ph.D. at Cornell University in 1992. Her dissertation, supervised by Allen Hatcher, was Constructing Taut Foliations.

Publications

References

External links
Home page

Year of birth missing (living people)
Living people
21st-century American mathematicians
American women mathematicians
Washington University in St. Louis faculty
Washington University in St. Louis mathematicians
Topologists
Cornell University alumni
21st-century American women